Tropic acid is a chemical with IUPAC name 3-hydroxy-2-phenylpropanoic acid and condensed structural formula HOCH2CHPhCOOH.  It is a laboratory reagent used in the chemical synthesis of atropine and hyoscyamine.  Tropic acid is a chiral substance, existing as either a racemic mixture or as a single enantiomer.

Synthesis

Prepn:

References

Beta hydroxy acids
Propionic acids